Aquatica ficta is a species of firefly found in Taiwan and parts of China. It was formerly placed in the genus Luciola. Its habitat is still water, and the larvae are aquatic.

Taxonomy
The species was described as Luciola ficta by Ernest Olivier in 1909. The type locality is Pin-fa, Guizhou. In 2010, Fu, Ballantyne and Lambkin transferred it and three other Luciola species to the new genus Aquatica.

Description
The male and female have the same colouration. The pronotum is orange, and the elytra are dark brown, with yellowish brown fringes. The legs have yellowish brown femora. The venter is yellowish brown and dark brown. The larva has gills and glands that secrete protective substances.

Distribution and habitat
A. ficta is found in Guizhou, Fujian, Hong Kong and Taiwan. It is commonly found in still water and rice paddies, and the larvae prefer muddy substrate. Adults occur all year. In Taiwan, they are most common in April and August.

Behaviour
The larvae are aquatic; not being able to swim, they crawl at the bottom of water. They go through six instars. They eat small invertebrates and carrion. The larvae probably burrow in mud during dry periods. The adult's light is green-yellow. The males fly to look for mates while the females usually do not fly, remaining on the ground. About 100 eggs are laid on moist soil or plants. In one experiment, the life cycle was completed in about 120 days. A 2010 study recorded about 390 days, the larval stage spanning about 330 days.

References

Lampyridae
Bioluminescent insects
Beetles of Asia
Insects of China
Insects of Taiwan
Invertebrates of Hong Kong
Beetles described in 1909